The second Haradinaj cabinet was formed the government of Kosovo from 9 September 2017 upon the defeat of Isa Mustafa and the LA Coalition in the 2017 elections to 3 February 2020 following its defeat in the 2019 parliamentary election. The cabinet was made up of members of the PANA Coalition and some members of the opposition.

Composition
The cabinet consists of the following Ministers:

Timeline

9 September 2017: Ramush Haradinaj and the majority of his cabinet take office.
10 September 2017: Pal Lekaj, the Minister of Infrastructure, takes office.
26 January 2018: An attempt to dismiss Dardan Gashi failed with only 36 of 88 MPs voting in favor. 
30 May 2018: Flamur Sefaj, the Minister of Internal Affairs, is dismissed after deporting several Turkish nationals. 
12 April 2018: The Special Prosecution of Kosovo filed an indictment against Pal Lekaj for corruption.
13 April 2018: Bejtush Gashi, the Minister of Internal Affairs, takes office.
5 September 2018: Burim Rrecaj, the Minister of Trade and Industry, is dismissed.
30 September 2018: Bejtush Gashi, the Minister of Internal Affairs, is dismissed.
1 October 2018: Endrit Shala, the Minister of Trade and Industry, takes office. Ekrem Mustafa, the Minister of Internal Affairs, takes office.
21 November 2018: Kosovo increases tariffs on Serbia and Bosnia by 100%.

References

Government ministers of Kosovo
Government of Kosovo
2017 establishments in Kosovo
Cabinets established in 2017
Cabinets disestablished in 2020
2020 disestablishments in Kosovo